Pilsbryspira albocincta, common name the white-banded turret, is a species of sea snail, a marine gastropod mollusk in the family Pseudomelatomidae, the turrids.

Description

The length of the shell varies between 7 mm and 14 mm. It is composed of alternating stripes of white and then reddish-brown knobs.

Distribution
P. albocincta can be found in Atlantic waters, ranging from the eastern coast of Florida to the Lesser Antilles.; also off Cuba, Panama and Brazil. It lives in the Benthic zone, 0 to 11 metres above the seafloor.

References

External links
 Rosenberg, G.; Moretzsohn, F.; García, E. F. (2009). Gastropoda (Mollusca) of the Gulf of Mexico, Pp. 579–699 in: Felder, D.L. and D.K. Camp (eds.), Gulf of Mexico–Origins, Waters, and Biota. Texas A&M Press, College Station, Texas
 
 Gastropods.com: Pilsbryspira albocincta
 Marine Mollusca from Guanahacabibes peninsula, Pinar del Rio, Cuba, with description of new taxa; Avicennia: revista de ecología, oceanología y biodiversidad tropical. no. 18 (2005)

albocincta
Gastropods described in 1845